The Battle for the Red Belt is an American college football rivalry between the Western Kentucky Hilltoppers football team of Western Kentucky University and the Murray State Racers football team of Murray State University.  The rivalry began as an in-conference rivalry within the Ohio Valley Conference (OVC), but both schools have since departed for other conferences. The Hilltoppers were the first to move, transitioning to the Football Bowl Subdivision and playing as an independent in the 2008 season before moving football to the Sun Belt Conference in 2009, followed by a move to Conference USA in 2014. The Racers, which remain in the Football Championship Subdivision to this day, played their final OVC season in 2022 and will join the Missouri Valley Football Conference in 2023. The rivalry has continued as a trophy game, although it is no longer played on an annual basis.

History
The football rivalry between the Hilltoppers and the Racers dates to 1931. Western Kentucky secured a victory in the first game on October 24, 1931. In 1939, both institutions strengthened the rivalry by scheduling the match up as the final game of their regular seasons. This tradition continued, with only four interruptions, for the next 46 years.

Prior to the 1955 football game, a group of Western Kentucky students traveled to Murray and stole a banner commemorating Murray State's participation in the 1949 Tangerine Bowl. In response, a group of Murray State students traveled to Bowling Green with buckets of paint and plans to paint the Western Kentucky water tower that overlooked the football stadium. The plan was stopped when the Murray State students were forced off the water tower by a group Western Kentucky students with an ROTC training rifle. A "W" was shaved into the hair of three of the Murray State students, and their photo appeared in the local newspaper along with a photo of the Western Kentucky students displaying their stolen Murray State Tangerine Bowl banner. Murray State won the 1955 game 28–12, and the Tangerine Bowl banner was returned to Murray State. Following the Racer victory, a similar banner was stolen from Western Kentucky's W Club room. Over the next decade, the water tower and statue of Henry Hardin Cherry remained targets of Murray State students any time the schools met in both football and basketball. In another incident, the phrase "Murray OVC Champs" was painted on an overpass near the Western Kentucky campus.

The football rivalry was cemented as an annual trophy game in 1978 known as the Battle for the Red Belt. The Red Belt originated in 1978 when WKU athletic trainer Bill Edwards attended a district trainers' meeting in Atlanta with Murray State trainer Tom Simmons. Simmons forgot to bring a belt, and borrowed a red one from Edwards. After the meeting, Edwards asked for the return of his belt, but Simmons responded that WKU would have to battle Murray State in football to get it back. Simmons had the belt mounted on a large plaque with brass plates to record the annual game scores of the annual rivalry game. The annual meetings between the two teams ended in 2000, but the Battle for the Red Belt is still played on in intermittent basis. The last game was played in 2008 when a record crowd of 22,297 in Bowling Green watched the Hilltoppers beat the Racers 50–9 and maintain possession of the Red Belt. The Racers and Hilltoppers have met 67 times in football, with Western Kentucky leading the series 36–24–7.

Game results

Notable games

2000
The 2000 game was final meeting between the Hilltoppers and Racers as both members of the Ohio Valley Conference. Keith Brooks rushed for a career-best 186 yards and three touchdowns Saturday, and DeWayne Gallishaw moved the ball for 118 yards on the ground to lead 24th-ranked Western Kentucky to a 48–38 OVC victory at Roy Stewart Stadium. Following the 2000 season, the Hilltoppers left the OVC as a result of a new OVC rule that required all eligible sports to participate in the conference. WKU was a football-only member of the OVC, and the university was not willing to move its other athletic programs back to the conference. Following the announcement, the head football coaches from both programs expressed the strong desire to keep the rivalry game on the schedule as an annual non-conference event.

2002
In 2002, WKU and Murray State met in the first round of the NCAA Division I-AA playoffs. The Hilltoppers beat the Racers 59–20 in front of 3,300 fans at L.T. Smith Stadium in Bowling Green. This was the first meeting between the two programs since WKU left the OVC to move to the Gateway Football Conference. The Hilltoppers went on to win their only NCAA Division I-AA National Championship.

See also  
 List of NCAA college football rivalry games

Footnotes

References

College football rivalries in the United States
Murray State Racers football
Western Kentucky Hilltoppers football
1931 establishments in Kentucky
Recurring sporting events established in 1931